Jessica Bianca Sula (born 3 May 1994) is a Welsh actress known for her portrayal of the character Grace Blood in the third generation of the television series Skins and for her role in the M. Night Shyamalan-directed horror film Split (2016).

Early life and education
Sula was born in Swansea to Trinidadian mother Shurla Blades, who has Afro-Trinidadian and Chinese ancestry, and to Steven Sula, a father of German and Estonian heritage. She grew up in Gorseinon, Wales, where she completed her A-levels in Spanish, French and Drama at Gorseinon College.

Career
Sula made her television debut in 2011, portraying Grace Blood in the fifth and sixth series of the E4 teen drama Skins.
Afterwards, she gained a supporting role in comedy drama Love and Marriage which was broadcast on ITV in 2013. In 2015, Sula was cast as the lead character, Maddie Graham, in the Freeform drama Recovery Road, alongside Skins co-star Sebastian de Souza. Her first big screen leading role was in Honeytrap, the story of a 15-year-old girl who sets up the murder of a boy who is in love with her. In 2017 she filmed the indie feature Big Fork, in which she played the main character, Emily.

Sula had a recurring role in the 2017 limited series Godless. That same year, it was announced that she would be a series regular for the third season of the series Scream, portraying high school cheerleader Olivia "Liv" Reynolds. The season premiered on VH1 on 8 July 2019.

Personal life
Sula plays the guitar and practices karate.

Filmography

Film

Television

References

External links
 
 

1994 births
21st-century British actresses 
Actresses from Swansea
Black British actresses
Living people
People from Gorseinon
Welsh people of Chinese descent
Welsh people of Estonian descent
Welsh people of German descent
Welsh people of Trinidad and Tobago descent
Welsh television actresses
British actresses of Chinese descent